The A-League National Youth League's 2010–11 season was the third season of the Australian A-League National Youth League football competition. Like the previous season, the current season ran in parallel with the A-League 2010–11 season.

Standings

Regular season

The 2010–11 A-League National Youth League season was played over 23 rounds- a shorter season than the previous one – and without a subsequent finals series.

Round 1

Round 2

Round 3

Round 4

Round 5

Round 6

Round 7

Round 8

Round 9

Round 10

Round 11

Round 12

Round 13

Round 14

Round 15

Round 16

Round 17

Round 18 

Round 19 

Round 20 

Round 21 

Round 22 

Round 23 

Notes:

Leading scorers

See also
 2010–11 Adelaide United FC season
 2010–11 Brisbane Roar FC season
 2010–11 Central Coast Mariners FC season
 2010–11 Gold Coast United FC season
 2010–11 Melbourne Victory FC season
 2010–11 Newcastle Jets FC season
 2010–11 Perth Glory FC season
 2010–11 Sydney FC season
 FFA Centre of Excellence

References

2010–11 A-League season
A-League National Youth League seasons